Terho Koskela (born 23 December 1964 in Salla, Finland) is a retired Finnish ice hockey player.
Koskela spent much of his career with Frölunda HC in Gothenburg, Sweden and served as club captain from 1992 to 1995.

He moved to Olofström in Blekinge County, Sweden when he was only one and a half years old. Then the Volvo factory was looking for labor and both his parents started working there.

References

External links

1964 births
Living people
People from Salla
Finnish emigrants to Sweden
Swedish people of Finnish descent
Frölunda HC players
Swedish ice hockey defencemen
Hamburg Crocodiles players
Rockford IceHogs (UHL) players
Abilene Aviators players